Martina Hingis was the defending champion, but did not compete this year.

Justine Henin won the title by defeating Kim Clijsters 6–4, 3–6, 6–3 in the final.

Seeds
The first two seeds received a bye into the second round.

Draw

Finals

Top half

Bottom half

References

External links
 Official results archive (ITF)
 Official results archive (WTA)

Women's Singles
Singles